Budbill is a surname. Notable people with the surname include:

 David Budbill (1940–2016), American poet and playwright
 Tiger Budbill, contestant in season 1 of the US series The X Factor